Kurt Meyer (born 1944) is a Swiss politician  and former member of the cantonal government of Lucerne heading the Finance department (1995–2005).

He is a member of the Christian Democratic People's Party (CVP).

References

Swiss politicians
1944 births
Living people
Date of birth missing (living people)